Cephalopappus is a genus of flowering plants in the family Asteraceae.

There is only one known species,  Cephalopappus sonchifolius, native to eastern Brazil (States of Bahia  and Rio de Janeiro).

References

Nassauvieae
Monotypic Asteraceae genera
Endemic flora of Brazil
Taxa named by Christian Gottfried Daniel Nees von Esenbeck